Tipsbladet is a weekly Danish sports magazine focusing on football. It the oldest football magazine in Scandinavia and is headquartered in Copenhagen, Denmark.

History and profile
Tipsbladet was founded by Elwin Hansen in 1948. The magazine, published on a weekly basis, is based in Copenhagen. The publisher of the weekly is TIPS-bladet A/S. As of 2015 Troels Bager Thogersen was the editor-in-chief of the magazine, which exclusively focuses on national Danish football leagues.

On 5 October 2012 Tipsbladet became the Friday edition of the newspaper Ekstra Bladet. Then it began to be published as a section of its Tuesday and Friday issues.

In 1975 Tipsbladet sold 32,380 copies.

References

External links
 

1948 establishments in Denmark
Association football magazines
Magazines established in 1948
Magazines published in Copenhagen
Newspaper supplements
Weekly magazines published in Denmark